The 1909–10 British Home Championship was an annual football competition played between the British Home Nations during the second half of the 1909/10 season. It was won by Scotland after a very close three-way competition between the Scots, England and Ireland which Scotland only won by a single point, Ireland and England coming joint second with Wales trailing, again by a single point.

England and Ireland were well matched throughout the contest, drawing in their opening match, a result which gave Scotland the advantage after they narrowly beat Wales in Kilmarnock during their opening game. Their challenge faltered in the second game as Ireland beat them by the same scoreline in Belfast. England too achieved a 1–0 win, over Wales in Cardiff. This put England and Ireland at the head of the table, but they were soon surpassed by the Scots, who defeated England 2–0 in Glasgow. Ireland's bid for the title was forestalled by Wales in the final match of the competition, who won 4–1 to score their only points of the competition in a powerful performance.

Table

Results

Winning squad

References

1910 in British sport
Brit
Brit
1909–10 in English football
1909–10 in Scottish football
1909-10